USS LST-951/LST(H)-951 was an  in the United States Navy. Like many of her class, she was not named and is properly referred to by her hull designation.

Construction
LST-951 was laid down on 8 September 1944, at Hingham, Massachusetts, by the Bethlehem-Hingham Shipyard; launched on 7 October 1944; sponsored by Mrs. O. P. Thomas, Jr.; and commissioned on 31 October 1944.

Service history
During World War II, LST-951 was assigned to the Asiatic-Pacific theater and participated in the assault and occupation of Okinawa Gunto from April through June 1945.

On 15 September 1945, she was redesignated LST(H)-951 and performed occupation duty in the Far East until mid-January 1945. The tank landing ship was decommissioned on 8 August 1946, and struck from the Navy list on 25 September, that same year. On 14 June 1948, the ship was sold to the Walter W. Johnson Co., for scrapping.

Awards
LST-951 earned one battle star for World War II service.

Notes

Citations

Bibliography 

Online resources

External links
 

LST-542-class tank landing ships
World War II amphibious warfare vessels of the United States
Ships built in Hingham, Massachusetts
1944 ships